Fareed Majeed Ghadban  (born 10 April 1986 in Iraq) is a former Iraqi footballer who is currently assistant coach of Al-Talaba.

Career

Majeed's physical energy has marked him out as a dependable stalwart on the domestic scene during stints with Iraqi clubs such as Al Talaba, Al Quwa Al Jawiya, Najaf FC and Al Shorta. Before earning his senior debut with the national team in 2007, he had played an active part with Iraq at age group levels, including winning the 2002 West Asia Football Federation (WAFF) Championship with Iraq's Olympic side. He played the 2004 AFC Champions League with Al Shorta, and captained Al Shorta in the 2013 Baghdad Cup Final which Al Shorta won 1–0.

Managerial statistics

Honors

Clubs
Al-Quwa Al-Jawiya
 Iraqi Premier League: 2004–05
Al-Shorta
 Iraqi Premier League: 2012–13

Country 
 2005 West Asian Games Gold medallist.
 2012 Arab Nations Cup Bronze medallist

External links 

Profil on www.goalzz.com

Iraqi footballers
Iraq international footballers
Iraqi expatriate footballers
2009 FIFA Confederations Cup players
1986 births
Living people
Al-Shorta SC players
Association football defenders
Association football midfielders